Bilfinger Power Systems GmbH, based in Oberhausen, Germany, is one of five business divisions of the German multinational construction and services company Bilfinger SE.

Business activities
Power Services primarily provides energy, environmental and pipeline technology. Bilfinger Berger also provides equipment such as steam generators and brine heaters as well as services including maintenance, installation, repair, power plant longevity assurance and power plant rehabilitation.

Bilfinger Berger Power Services focuses on construction, reconstruction and fabrication as well as providing spares and components to industrial plants, oil refineries and sewage treatment plants. A large percentage of these parts, such as pressure vessels and heat exchangers, are also fabricated on-demand from some of its regional manufacturing facilities.

At the end of the 2010 fiscal year, Bilfinger Berger Power Services employed approximately 7,400 specialized technicians, 3,200 administrative employees and 265 trainees.

Subsidiary companies
A dense network of branches links the activities in the group's major markets: Germany, Europe, Middle East, and South Africa.
 Babcock Borsig Steinmueller GmbH
 Babcock Noell GmbH
 BHR Hochdruck-Rohrleitungsbau GmbH
 Bilfinger Berger Power Holdings (Pty) Ltd., South Africa
 Deutsche Babcock Middle East, United Arab Emirates
 Deutsche Babcock Al Jaber, Qatar
 Duro Dakovic Montaza d.d., Croatia
 MCE Berlin GmbH
 MCE Aschersleben GmbH
 MCE Machine and Equipment Construction GmbH & Co. KG
 Rosink Plant and Equipment GmbH
 Rotring Engineering GmbH

History
{|
| style="width:10%;"|Date
| style="width:90%;"|Milestone
|- valign="top"
|08/2003
|Deutsche Babcock AG buys Babcock Borsig Service Group from the bankruptcy of Babcock Borsig AG.
|- valign="top"
|09/2003
|Deutsche Babcock Al Jaber is established by Deutsche Babcock Middle East as joint-venture in Qatar.
|- valign="top"
|12/2003
|Babcock Borsig Service buys Steinmüller-Gesellschaft Steinmüller Engineering Service (Pty) Ltd.
|- valign="top"
|01/2005
|Acquisition of license for flue gas desulfurization by Babcock & Wilcox, USA.
|- valign="top"
|04/2005
|Bilfinger Berger AG acquires all shares in Babcock Borsig Service Group.
|- valign="top"
|05/2006
|Changed name from Deutsche Babcock GmbH to Bilfinger Berger Power Services GmbH
|- valign="top"
|05/2006
|Acquisition of BHR Hochdruck-Rohrleitungsbau GmbH.
|- valign="top"
|04/2009
|Acquisition of 80.5% stake in Croatian company Duro Dakovic Montaza d.d. (formerly of Đuro Đaković)
|- valign="top"
|10/2010
|Bilfinger Berger Power Services GmbH takes over Rotring Engineering AG.
|- valign="top"
|02/2010
|Acquisition of MCE Maschinen-und Apparatebau GmbH & Co. KG as part of the power services segment.
|- valign="top"
|03/2010
|Power services becomes a separate division within Bilfinger Berger AG.
|- valign="top"
|09/2011
|Acquisition of equipment Rosink Anlagen und Apparatenbau GmbH.
|- valign="top"
|10/2011
|Acquisition of the remaining shares of the Duro Dakovic Montaza dd (100%).
|}

See also
Bilfinger Berger
Babcock Borsig Service
Deutsche Babcock Middle East
Deutsche Babcock Al Jaber

References

External links
 Bilfinger Berger Power Services Official Website

Companies based in Baden-Württemberg
Construction and civil engineering companies of Germany
Oberhausen
Engineering companies of Germany
Construction and civil engineering companies established in 2003
German companies established in 2003